Jordan Spence (born February 24, 2001) is an Australian-born Japanese-Canadian professional ice hockey defenceman for the Ontario Reign of the American Hockey League (AHL) as a prospect to the Los Angeles Kings of the National Hockey League (NHL). He was drafted in the fourth round, 95th overall, in the 2019 NHL Entry Draft by the Kings.

Playing career

After one season with the Moncton Wildcats of the Quebec Major Junior Hockey League (QMJHL), Spence was drafted in the fourth round, 95th overall, by the Los Angeles Kings in the 2019 NHL Entry Draft. He returned to the Wildcats the following year. On June 3, 2020, the Kings signed Spence to a three-year, entry-level contract.

Spence joined the Kings' American Hockey League (AHL) affiliate, the Ontario Reign to begin the 2021–22 season. He made his NHL debut with the Kings on March 10, 2022, becoming the first Australian born player, as well as the first skater with Japanese citizenship to play in the NHL. On March 26, Spence scored his first career NHL goal in a 4–2 win over the Seattle Kraken.

Personal life
Spence was born in Manly, New South Wales to a Canadian father, Adam, and a Japanese mother, Kyoko, before moving to Osaka, where he first played baseball, as well as hockey under the tutelage of his father at the age of five, before moving to Cornwall, Prince Edward Island at the age of 13 not knowing any English. Before his 20th birthday he was a dual citizen of Canada and Japan and is fluent in English, French, and Japanese.

Career statistics

Regular season and playoffs

International

Awards and honours

References

External links
 

2001 births
Living people
Canadian ice hockey defencemen
Canadian sportspeople of Japanese descent
Japanese ice hockey defencemen
Los Angeles Kings draft picks
Los Angeles Kings players
Moncton Wildcats players
Ontario Reign (AHL) players
People from Queens County, Prince Edward Island
People from Osaka
Val-d'Or Foreurs players